SS Thistlegarth was a British armed merchant Cargo ship that the German Submarine U-103 torpedoed and sunk in the Atlantic Ocean  west-northwest of Rockall while she was travelling in Convoy OB 228 from Scapa Flow, Orkney Islands, Scotland, United Kingdom to Father Point, New Brunswick, Canada in ballast.

Construction 
Thistlegarth was built at the James Laing & Sons Ltd. shipyard in Sunderland, United Kingdom, she was launched in July and completed in September 1929. The ship could generate 430 n.h.p. and could reach a speed of 10 knots.

Sinking 
The ship took on a noticeable list and the crew abandoned ship, but reboarded her later when they noticed that Thistlegarth didn't appear to be sinking. The ship's lingering buoyancy also caught the attention of U-103, who decided to surface and fired her deck gun at the damaged ship. Not realising the Thistlegarth was armed with guns of her own, U-103 had to crash dive after firing only three shots due to their target returning fire at them.

Victory remained short, as Thistlegarth was hit by a coup de grâce under the aft mast on her starboard side at 21.42pm, which broke her in two and sank her in two minutes. The crew had all safely evacuated into two lifeboats and awaited rescue. The first lifeboat with nine crew members on board were rescued by HMS Heartsease on 18 October, but the second lifeboat containing 28 crew members, the captain and a gunner was never seen again and are presumed lost at sea.

Wreck 

References

1929 ships
Ships built on the River Wear
World War II shipwrecks in the Atlantic Ocean
Cargo ships of the United Kingdom
Steamships of the United Kingdom
Maritime incidents in October 1940
Ships sunk by German submarines in World War II